Marpha  is a village in Mustang District in the Dhawalagiri Zone of northern Nepal. At the time of the 1991 Nepal census it had a population of 1630 people living in 434 individual households.

The village is a part of the trekking industry, and has a nearby Tibetan refugee camp. Tibetans from the camp work in the village, supporting the tourist and trekking service sector. It is in a scenic location and apples are an important crop for the area.

Formerly, Marpha was a village development committee (VDC), which were local-level administrative units. In 2017, the government of Nepal restructured local government in line with the 2015 constitution and VDCs were discontinued.

Sights
Marpha is a pretty stone lined village which has survived the transition to the current time, by catering to trekkers and tourists. The village is a common overnight halt on the Annapurna Circuit, less crowded and touristy than Jomsom to the north.

The name itself reflects the "mar" meaning hard working and "pha" meaning people. Tourism and mule rearing are the means of survival of the people of this place. Although it has an original Safe Water Drinking station, it now also sports numerous guest houses and small hotels.

The village is the apple capital in the nation, with Marpha brandy and jams produced from local fruits.

Dominating the village is the Nyingma monastery from which there are good views of the village and the Gandaki River valley. Above the monastery is a chorten painted onto the cliff face and a number of small stone chortens on the ledges below. Legend says that the villagers became afflicted with leprosy and all attempts to control it had failed. A local monk, originally from Tukuche, south of Marpha, advised the villagers to build the chorten and hold religious rituals at the site. Since that time the leprosy stopped and Marpha flourished once more.

On the southern outskirts of Marpha, on the opposite bank of the Gandaki River is a Tibetan refugee camp and Chhairo gompa, the first Nyingma monastery to be established in Mustang District.

Many of the souvenir shops in Marpha are run by residents of the Tibetan refugee camp.

Climate
Marpha has a cold semi-arid climate (BSk) with cold, dry winters and mild, slightly wet summers.

Gallery

References

External links
UN map of the municipalities of Mustang District

Populated places in Mustang District